Township of Crawford is one of 37 townships in Washington County, Arkansas, United States. As of the 2000 census, its total population was 800.

Geography

Crawford Township was created in 1878 from part of West Fork Township. It gave part to Lee's Creek Township in 1880.

Cities, towns, villages
Brentwood
Woolsey
Wyola

Cemeteries
The township contains Woolsey Cemetery.

Major routes
 U.S. Route 71
 Arkansas Highway 74

References

 United States Census Bureau 2008 TIGER/Line Shapefiles
 United States National Atlas

External links
 City-Data.com

Townships in Washington County, Arkansas
Populated places established in 1878
Townships in Arkansas